Borås Basket is a professional basketball club based in the Swedish town of Borås. The club was founded in 1952 and currently compete in the Swedish Basketball League (SBL), the country's premier league.

Borås has played in European competitions multiple times in its history; in 1995, 1996 and 2000 it played in the FIBA Korac Cup. In 2014 Borås returned to Europe when it entered the EuroChallenge.

History
In the 1999–2000 season, Borås was personally sponsored by National Basketball Association (NBA) player Magic Johnson and was named "Magic M7 Borås". Johnson himself played 5 games for the club between October and January that season. Johnson joined the roster and was undefeated in five games with the team. Johnson also became a co-owner of the club; however, the project failed after one season and the club was forced into reconstruction. 

Since 2007, Borås is again active in the Basketligan, the highest tier of Swedish basketball.

In the 2019–20 season, Borås won its first Swedish championship under special circumstances. Due to the COVID-19 pandemic, the season was ended prematurely and the team won the championship based on its first place in the regular season.

Honours
Swedish Basketball League
Champions (1): 2019–20

Season by season

Players

Current roster

Notable players

Notes

References

External links
  Official website

Basketball teams in Sweden
Sport in Borås
Basketball teams established in 1952
1952 establishments in Sweden
Sverige är najs
Jag heter liam